FLF may refer to:
 Flensburg-Schäferhaus Airport, in Germany
 Flowery Field railway station, in England
 Freedom Leadership Foundation, a project of the Unification movement of Sun Myung Moon
 Frontline Force, a mod for the computer game Half-Life
 La Fayette-class frigate
 Luxembourg Football Federation